Activision Blizzard Studios, LLC is a motion picture production company and a subsidiary of American video game company Activision Blizzard based in Beverly Hills, California. It was created to utilize its parent company's popular game franchises through films and television shows. It is co-headed by Stacey Sher and Nick van Dyk, the latter being a former executive of The Walt Disney Company.

History 
At an investor day presentation on November 6, 2015, in the wake of the Warcraft feature film, Activision Blizzard announced the formation of Activision Blizzard Studios, a film production subsidiary dedicated to creating original television series and films based on their video game franchises. In January 2016, the company announced that the studio will be co-headed by producer Stacey Sher and former The Walt Disney Company executive Nick van Dyk.

In 2016, the company partnered with Netflix to exclusively air its first television program, an animated series based on Activision's video game series Skylanders, called Skylanders Academy.

Also in 2016, Activision Blizzard Studios entered into a content licensing agreement with a third-party production studio, Legendary Pictures, to produce sequels to the Warcraft feature film, based on their video game franchise World of Warcraft. By April 2017, work on a film based on Activision's video game series Call of Duty had generated several scripts, with the hope that filming would begin in 2018. The company also hopes to create films based on Overwatch and others.

A movie for Call of Duty has been announced in 2015 during the investor day, however in 2020 the movie director Stefano Sollima said the movie production is "in limbo" and "has stood still", saying “the idea of expanding the universe, the world of Call of Duty, is no longer at the moment an industrial priority of the group, of Activision.”

Productions

Film

Television

Cancelled

References

External links 
 

Activision Blizzard
Film production companies of the United States
Television production companies of the United States
Companies based in Beverly Hills, California
American companies established in 2015
2015 establishments in California
2015 establishments in the United States